Litsea travancorica is a species of plant in the family Lauraceae. It is endemic to India.

References

travancorica
Endemic flora of India (region)
Endangered flora of Asia
Taxonomy articles created by Polbot